Zarphatic, or Judeo-French (Zarphatic: Tzarfatit), is an extinct Jewish language that was spoken by the French Jews of northern France and in parts of west-central Germany, such as Mainz, Frankfurt am Main and Aix-la-Chapelle. It was also spoken by French Jews who moved to Norman England.

Etymology 
Some have conjectured that the language influenced the development of Yiddish.

Writing 

Zarphatic was written using a variation of the Hebrew alphabet. It first appeared in this form in the 11th century in glosses of the Torah and Talmud written by the rabbis Moshe HaDarshan and Rashi, the latter of whom is credited as the inventor of uncial Hebrew writing. The language became secularised during the 13th century, becoming used in varied domains such as poetry, medicine, astronomy, and commerce.

Most linguists agree that Zarphatic was not fundamentally different from Old French, and that it was more of a writing system, literary tradition, and specific vocabulary that reflected the Jewish culture of the day. According to some researchers, it was different from the Christian majority dialect, and thus a specific Judeo-Romance language.

It seems that Zarphatic was probably never a vernacular language, and that the Jews of the area did not speak a differing language or dialect, at least not one distinguished by phonology or lexicon beyond that specific to a community. Rather, it acted more as a liturgical language, for exegesis and literature. Its primary use was for explanation and vulgarisation of biblical and rabbinical literature.

See also 
Judeo-Romance languages

References

Information for this article draws heavily on the information presented on the Jewish Languages project Judeo-French page
 
 Philippe Bobichon, Controverse judéo-chrétienne en Ashkenaz (XIIIe s.). Florilèges polémiques : hébreu, latin, ancien français, Bibliothèque de l’EPHE-SR, Paris, 2015 online

External links
 Menahem Banitt and Cyril Aslanov (1972, 2006), Judeo-French , from Encyclopaedia Judaica; via Jewish Virtual Library

Oïl languages
Extinct Romance languages
Judaeo-French languages
Macaronic forms of French
Medieval languages
Languages extinct in the 14th century